The Bilciurești gas field is a natural gas field located in Bilciurești, Dâmbovița County, Romania. It was discovered in 1962 and developed by Romgaz. It began production in 1962 and produces natural gas and condensates. The total proven reserves of the Bilciurești gas field are around 100 billion cubic feet (2.86 km³), and production is slated to be around 4.9 million cubic feet/day (0.14×105m³) in 2010.

References

Natural gas fields in Romania
Geography of Dâmbovița County